The 2005 O'Byrne Cup was a Gaelic football competition played by the teams of Leinster GAA. The competition differs from the Leinster Senior Football Championship as it also features further education colleges. It was won by Laois.

O'Byrne Cup
In a preliminary round game on 8 December 2004, D.I.T. beat Trinity College (2-8 to 1-8)

References

External links
Leinster G.A.A. Results 2005

O'Byrne Cup
O'Byrne Cup